New Orleans Privateers basketball may refer to either of the basketball teams that represent the University of New Orleans:
New Orleans Privateers men's basketball
New Orleans Privateers women's basketball